NK Papuk Velika is a Croatian football club from Velika, a small town near Požega in the northeast of Croatia. The club was formed as a successor of once highly successful club NK Kamen Ingrad that was dissolved in 2008.

References

Papuk Velika
Papuk Velika
Association football clubs established in 2008
2008 establishments in Croatia